Bi-curious is a term for a person, usually someone who is a heterosexual, who is curious or open about engaging in sexual activity with a person whose sex differs from that of their usual sexual partners. The term is sometimes used to describe a broad continuum of sexual orientation between heterosexuality and bisexuality. Such continuums include mostly-heterosexual or mostly-homosexual, but these can be self-identified without identifying as bisexual. The terms heteroflexible and homoflexible are mainly applied to bi-curious people, though some authors distinguish heteroflexibility and homoflexibility as lacking the "wish to experiment with sexuality" implied by the bi-curious label. To sum it up, the difference between bisexual and bicurious is that bisexual people know that they are sexually attracted to both genders based on personal experience. Bicurious people are still maneuvering their way through their sexuality.

Etymology 
The term started becoming popular after 1984, according to Merriam-Webster, but The New Partridge Dictionary of Slang and Unconventional English and Oxford Dictionaries’ Lexico claim that the term was coined in 1990. According to Dictionary.com, the term was first used between 1980 and 1985.

See also
Bambi effect
Sexual fluidity

References

Bisexuality
Bisexual pornography
LGBT slang
Pornography terminology
Sexual fluidity